Kue semprong, Asian egg roll, sapit, sepit, kue Belanda, or kapit, (Love letters in English) is an Indonesian traditional wafer snack (kue or kuih) made by clasping egg batter using an iron mold (Waffle iron) which is heated up on a charcoal stove. It is commonly found in Indonesia, Malaysia, Singapore and Brunei.

The mold each has two plates that are clasped tightly together and attached to long handles for manipulating over a charcoal stove. The molds could be plainly flat, corrugated or etched with animal motifs such as fish, roosters and snails that are both auspicious and decorative.

Shapes and variants
In Indonesian the term semprong means "tube" or "roll", while sepit derived from jepit which means "clip". Both semprong and sepit are known as almost identical wafers, with the different only in its shape; the roll-shaped is called semprong, while the triangular-folded shape is called sepit. Both variants are called as sapit or sepit in Malaysia and Brunei, regardless of its shape. Traditional kue semprong are hollow, the new variants however, might add fillings, such as chocolate or cheese.

History and origin

The kue semprong demonstrate colonial link between Indonesia and the Netherlands, as it commonly found in most of major cities in Indonesia. It is believed to be derived from Dutch egg roll wafer. The word Belanda, meaning Dutch in Bahasa Indonesia, points to the egg rolls’ Dutch origins. The Dutch have a vast biscuit repertoire, which includes thin wafer biscuits similar to Kuih Belanda or Kuih Kapit. Many biscuit and cake techniques were passed to Malays by the Dutch, English, and Portuguese. These biscuits may have been brought to parts of Malaysia and Singapore from Penang, Malacca, by the Peranakan Chinese, who, not knowing the name of the Dutch snack they had encountered, simply called it kuih Belanda or kuih kapit.

See also

 Kue gapit
 Egg roll
 Crepes
 Peranakan cuisine
 Biscuit roll
 Fortune cookie
 Barquillo

References

External links 
Kue Semprong recipe
Kuih Kapit aka Love Letter
 Recipe Love Letters (Kuih Kapit) Made the Traditional Way | Virtual Malaysia 
Kuih Belanda
Originality of kuih belanda in Medan
 Kuih Sepit

Bruneian cuisine
Indonesian snack foods
Malaysian snack foods
Singaporean cuisine